John Fox (31 March 1892 – 22 July 1967) was an Irish hurler who played as a right corner-back for the Clare senior team.

Fox was a regular member of the starting fifteen throughout the second decade of the twentieth century. He was particularly active during the 1914 championship when he won a set of All-Ireland and Leinster winners' medals.

At club level Fox enjoyed a lengthy career with Newmarket-on-Fergus, winning numerous county championship medals.

In the middle of his club career Fox enlisted in the British Army and saw action during World War I, including at the Battle of the Somme.

References

1892 births
1967 deaths
Newmarket-on-Fergus hurlers
Clare inter-county hurlers
All-Ireland Senior Hurling Championship winners
British Army personnel of World War I